Philip Chan may refer to:

 Philip Chan (actor) (born 1945), Hong Kong actor, film director, producer and screenwriter
 Philip Chan (scientist), Hong Kong professor of electrical and electronic engineering